Never Look Back is the eighth studio album by American ska punk band Goldfinger, released on December 4, 2020. It marks the return of original guitarist Charlie Paulson, who joins the previous album's line-up of guitarist/vocalist and founding member John Feldmann, lead guitarist Philip Sneed (Story of the Year), bassist Mike Herrera (MxPx, Mike Herrera's Tumbledown) and drummer Nick Gross. It is also their first album via Feldmann's own Big Noise Records.

The album cover features the same woman seen at the cover of their 1996 debut.

Track listing

Reception 

Simon Valentine from Wall of Sound gave the album maximum score and finished his review by saying: "Honestly, after a brutal year Never Look Back has been a warm surprise from one of my favourite bands of late, and after a few repeated listens I think Goldfinger have shown excellent timing with one of the standout releases of 2020."

John Longbottom, from Kerrang!, noted that "musically, there's [...] just high-energy, feel-good punk rock that's as sure of itself as you'd expect from a band with 25-plus years under their belt. From turbo-charged, fist-pumping opener Infinite, to horn-laden, hands-in-the-air anthem The Best Life, all the component parts of a 24-carat Goldfinger record are present and accounted for." He gave it a score of 4/5 and finished his review saying that "ultimately, whichever way you cut it, Never Look Back encapsulates everything great about Goldfinger".

Writing for Distorted Sound Mag, Jack Fermor-Worrell said "the final result is a joyous release that, while not perfect, manages to both throw back to the band's classic days and still avoiding sounding overly dated or tired. [...] Never Look Back is a second home-run in a row for GOLDFINGER, and one fans of the anything pop-punk, ska-based or otherwise, are sure to find enjoyment in."

Jessica Deanne J from Hysteria Magazine commented that "it's nice that Goldfinger have kept their light, cheeky and youthful sound in Never Look Back, after being a band together for over twenty years."

Personnel
Credits adapted from sources.

Goldfinger
 John Feldmann - lead vocals, rhythm guitar
 Charlie Paulson - lead guitar, vocals
 Mike Herrera - bass guitar, vocals
 Philip Sneed - guitars
 Nick Gross - drums

Additional musicians
 Monique Powell - co-lead vocals on "Careful What You Wish For"
 Avril Lavigne - co-lead vocals on "Here In Your Bedroom"
 Simon Neil - vocals on "Superman"
 Travis Barker - drums (tracks 13, 14, 15)
 Matt Appleton - horns 
Reade Wolcott - additional guitars and additional vocals
Jon Graber - additional guitars on "The Best Life", organ on "California on My Mind," "The Best Life," and "Dumb"

Production
 John Feldmann - Producer, Engineer, Mixer
 Jon Graber - Co-Producer, Engineer
Reade Wolcott - Co-Producer, Engineer
Dylan McClean - Engineer
Scot Stewart - Engineer
Josh Thornberry - Assistant Engineer
Jake Magness - Assistant Engineer
Ted Jensen - Mastering

References

2020 albums
Goldfinger (band) albums